John William Green (born 10 July 1930) is an Australian botanist.

Career
Green began his botanical career in 1954 as assistant botanist in the Western Australian Herbarium. He remained in that position until 1958, in his final year serving as botanical adviser to phytochemical surveys in the southwest. He then took up a position at the University of New England at Armidale, New South Wales until 1963, when he moved to Canberra, initially as an academic, and after 1966 as a researcher at the Forest Research Institute. In 1970 he moved to Ontario, Canada, taking up a post as professor at the Laurentian University.

In 1975, Green returned to Australia, taking on the post of curator to the Western Australian Herbarium. He held that position until 1987. During this time he oversaw the introduction of database systems for management of collections.

Plant taxa publications
Green has published a number of plant taxa, among which the following are still current:

Tersonia cyathiflora
Conostylis aculeata subsp. rhipidion
Conostylis argentea
Conostylis crassinerva
Conostylis deplexa
Conostylis teretifolia
Corynanthera
Corynanthera flava
Malleostemon
Malleostemon hursthousei
Malleostemon minilyaensis
Malleostemon pedunculatus
Malleostemon peltiger
Malleostemon roseus
Malleostemon tuberculatus
Micromyrtus barbata
Micromyrtus blakelyi
Micromyrtus fimbrisepala
Micromyrtus helmsii
Micromyrtus obovata
Micromyrtus serrulata
Micromyrtus sessilis
Micromyrtus striata
Micromyrtus stenocalyx
Thryptomene biseriata
Thryptomene cuspidata
Thryptomene decussata
Thryptomene longifolia
Thryptomene naviculata
Thryptomene nealensis
Thryptomene wittweri

He was also collector of the type specimen of Eucalyptus dolichorhyncha.

References

20th-century Australian botanists
Australian taxonomists
1930 births
Living people
Botanists active in Australia
Academic staff of Laurentian University
Scientists from Western Australia
Academic staff of the University of New England (Australia)
21st-century Australian botanists